Alexander Christian Mortensen (born November 24, 1985) is an American football coach and former quarterback. He played college football at Arkansas and at Samford. He was signed by the Tennessee Titans as an undrafted free agent in 2009.

High school career
Mortensen attended Landmark Christian School in Atlanta, Georgia. He was named the 2003 Atlanta Journal-Constitution Class-A Offensive Player of the Year at Landmark Christian. As a senior, he completed 159-of-269 passes for 2,565 yards and 29 touchdowns, was named first-team all-state by the Associated Press and the Atlanta Journal-Constitution and was a three-time all-state selection. The team posted a record of 29–7 over his last three seasons. He was also selected to the Tom Lemming's Prep Football Report All-America squad, which ranked him as the No. 25 overall quarterback in the country and the No. 1 quarterback in Georgia and was rated as the No. 29 pro-style quarterback in the nation by Rivals.com. He received the Headmaster's Award for student leadership in high school.

College career
Mortensen began his college career at Arkansas before transferring to Samford, then returning to Arkansas to finish. Mortensen's cumulative stats in college were 40-84 for 372 yards, four touchdowns and four interceptions.

In 2005, Mortensen announced: "On Friday, I had a bittersweet meeting with Coach Nutt when I told him that I would be leaving the University of Arkansas and that I will transfer to Samford University in Birmingham, Alabama, beginning this fall of 2006."

Professional career

Tennessee Titans
After going undrafted in the 2009 NFL Draft, Mortensen was signed by the Tennessee Titans as an undrafted free agent. He played an offensive series in the Hall of Fame Game against the Buffalo Bills on August 9, completeling 1-of-2 with an interception returned for a touchdown by Bills cornerback Reggie Corner. Two days later, the Titans waived Mortensen.

Coaching career
In 2012, Mortensen joined New Mexico Highlands University as Passing Game Coordinator. He then spent 2013 as a coaching assistant with the St. Louis Rams. In 2014, he joined the Alabama Crimson Tide as an offensive graduate assistant.

In 2018, Mortensen became the wide receivers coach for the Birmingham Iron of the Alliance of American Football.

Mortensen was named Offensive Coordinator of the UAB Blazers by Head Coach Trent Dilfer on December 2, 2022.

Personal life
Mortensen is the son of ESPN NFL analyst Chris Mortensen and Micki Mortensen.

References

External links
 Tennessee Titans bio

1985 births
Living people
American football quarterbacks
Arkansas Razorbacks football players
Birmingham Iron coaches
Players of American football from Atlanta
Samford Bulldogs football players
Tennessee Titans players 
Alabama Crimson Tide football coaches